Léon-Jean-Bazille Perrault (Poitiers 16 June 1832 – 1908 Royan) was a French academic painter.

Biography
He was born to a modest family. A student of William Bouguereau and François-Edouard Picot, one of his earliest works is the 1861 The Death of Priam and he exhibited at the Salon from 1863 onwards, producing many genre works which were immensely popular.  He was famous for his le petit naufragé (The little shipwrecked boy, 1874) and his paintings of children.

Gallery

External links 

 Sleeping Putto, 1882 - Rehs Galleries' biography on Leon Perrault and an image of his painting Sleeping Putto.
 Léon Bazile Perrault at the Art Renewal Center
  - Catalogue Raisonné for the Complete Works of Leon Bazile Perrault

People from Poitiers
1832 births
1908 deaths
Burials at Passy Cemetery
19th-century French painters
French male painters
20th-century French painters
20th-century French male artists
Academic art
19th-century French male artists